Marisa Colleen Dalrymple-Philibert is a Jamaican attorney-at-law and politician, representing the Jamaica Labour Party (JLP). She is the 15th and current Speaker of the House of Representatives.

Early life and education
Dalrymple-Philibert was born in St. Ann, Jamaica . She attended Westwood High School, University of the West Indies at Cave Hill, Barbados, and the Norman Manley Law School.

Political career
Dalrymple-Philibert first entered representational politics in 2007 when she won the general election from the Trelawny Southern constituency, polling 6,167 votes to Doneth Brown-Reid (4,570) of the People's National Party (PNP). She served as Deputy Speaker of the House of Representatives (2007-2011). On July 12, 2011, Dalrymple-Philibert was elected the 15th Speaker of the House of Representatives, succeeding Delroy Chuck, who had been appointed  Minister of Justice. She became only the second woman to occupy this position after Violet Neilson of the PNP (1997-2003). Dalrymple-Philibert was re-elected to Parliament from the Trelawny Southern constituency in back-to-back general elections in 2011, 2016, and again in 2020. On September 15, 2020, Dalrymple-Philibert was once again elected Speaker of the House of Representatives, following the retirement of Pearnel Charles Sr.

Personal life
Dalrymple-Philibert is married to Sherold Philibert. The couple have four adult children.

See also
 List of speakers of the House of Representatives of Jamaica
 Women in the House of Representatives of Jamaica
 List of female members of the House of Representatives of Jamaica

References

Living people
Year of birth missing (living people)
People from Saint Ann Parish
Jamaica Labour Party politicians
Members of the House of Representatives of Jamaica
21st-century Jamaican women politicians
21st-century Jamaican politicians
Speakers of the House of Representatives of Jamaica
Women legislative speakers
Members of the 14th Parliament of Jamaica